Soa is a language of central Flores, in East Nusa Tenggara Province, Indonesia. It forms a dialect cluster with Ngadha.

References

Sumba languages
Languages of Indonesia